Allahlu (also Romanized as Allahlū; also known as ‘Alavī, Alyali, Lalahlū, Lalallū, Laleh Loo, and Lalehlū) is a village in Ozomdel-e Jonubi Rural District, in the Central District of Varzaqan County, East Azerbaijan Province, Iran. At the 2006 census, its population was 820, in 190 families.

References 

Towns and villages in Varzaqan County